Iwonicz  is a village in the administrative district of Gmina Iwonicz-Zdrój, within Krosno County, Subcarpathian Voivodeship, in south-eastern Poland.

The village has a population of 4,509.

See also
 Walddeutsche

References

Villages in Krosno County